This is a list of arenas that currently serve as the home venue for NCAA Division II college basketball teams. The arenas serve as home venues for both the men's and women's teams except where noted. In addition, venues which are not located on campus or are used infrequently during the season have been listed.

All listed capacities are the full normal capacities for basketball and do not reflect attendance restrictions due to COVID-19.

Current arenas
All conference affiliations are current for the upcoming 2022–23 season.

Notes

References

 
NCAA Division II basketball
Basketball
College basketball in the United States lists